The Waitakaruru River is a river of the Waikato Region of New Zealand's North Island. It flows initially north before turning northwest across the northwestern corner of the Hauraki Plains, reaching the southwestern corner of the Firth of Thames close to the settlement of Waitakaruru.

Grey mangrove, or  mānawa, has rapidly colonised the estuary since 1940, due to sediment deposited by the rivers and climate change.

The river should not be confused with the similarly named Waitakaruru Stream, which is also in the Waikato Region, near Morrinsville.

Pollution 
In its lower reaches the river is not fit for swimming, as the nitrogen and phosphorus pollution levels are many times those of the natural river.

Pollution has generally been worsening, as shown in this table -

Monthly records are flow-adjusted using a Lowess curve fit with 30% span.

See also
List of rivers of New Zealand

References

External links
 1:50,000 map
 1991 hydrological report and map of catchment
 2006 estuary vegetation survey

Thames-Coromandel District
Rivers of Waikato
Rivers of New Zealand
Firth of Thames
Hauraki Gulf catchment